King for a Night is a 1933 American pre-Code crime film directed by Kurt Neumann starring Chester Morris and Helen Twelvetrees.

Plot
A prizefighter is convicted of a murder that was actually committed by his sister.

Cast
 Chester Morris as Bud Williams  
 Helen Twelvetrees as Lillian Williams  
 Alice White as Evelyn  
 John Miljan as Walter Douglas  
 Grant Mitchell as Rev. John Williams  
 Frank Albertson as Dick Morris  
 George Meeker as John Williams  
 Warren Hymer as Goofy  
 Max 'Slapsie Maxie' Rosenbloom as Maxie  
 John Sheehan as Manny  
 George E. Stone as Hymie  
 Harland Tucker as Nick Merkle 
 Harry Galfund as The Champ 
 Clarence Wilson as Mr. Whistler  
 Dorothy Granger as Dora 
 Wade Boteler as McCue
 Adrian Morris as Crap Shooter

References

Bibliography
 Quinlan, David. The Film Lover's Companion: An A to Z Guide to 2,000 Stars and the Movies They Made. Carol Publishing Group, 1997.

External links
 

1933 films
1933 crime films
1930s sports films
American boxing films
American crime films
Films directed by Kurt Neumann
Universal Pictures films
American black-and-white films
1930s English-language films
1930s American films